The Chosun Ilbo is a daily newspaper in South Korea and the oldest daily newspaper in the country. With a daily circulation of more than 1,800,000, the Chosun Ilbo has been audited annually since the Audit Bureau of Circulations was established in 1993. Chosun Ilbo and its subsidiary company, Digital Chosun, operates the Chosun.com news website, which also publishes web versions of the newspaper in English, Chinese, and Japanese.  The paper is considered a newspaper of record for South Korea.

History
The Chosun Ilbo Establishment Union was created in September 1919 while the Chosun Ilbo company was founded on 5 March 1920 by Sin Sogu.

On 31 July 1940, the newspaper published "Lessons of American Realism", the fourth part of an editorial series. Ten days later - following issue 6,923 - the paper was declared officially discontinued by the Japanese ruling government. In the twenty years since its founding, the paper had been suspended by the Japanese government four times, and its issues confiscated over five hundred times before 1932.

When Korea gained independence in 1945, the Chosun Ilbo came back into publication after a five-year, three-month hiatus.

The paper is considered a newspaper of record in Korea.

Subsidiaries 
Besides the daily newspaper, the company also publishes the weekly Jugan Chosun, the monthly Wolgan Chosun and other newspapers and magazines. Subsidiaries include Digital Chosun, Wolgan Chosun, Edu-Chosun, and ChosunBiz.

North Korean position 
The Chosun Ilbo has taken a skeptical line on governmental policy towards North Korea such as Kim Dae-jung's "Sunshine policy". For this reason, it has attracted heavy criticism and threats from the North.

Controversy

On 31 May 2019, the newspaper reported that, based on "an unidentified source", the head diplomat of North Korea's nuclear envoy Kim Hyok-chol, had been executed by a North Korean Government firing squad. However, two days later, on 2 June 2019, the top diplomat was seen at a concert sitting a few seats away from North Korea's leader Kim Jong-un.

The Educational Broadcasting System's popular instructor Choi Tae-seong, sued a Chosun Ilbo reporter for publishing an article that defamed him as a supporter of North Korea.

The Chosun Ilbo has been accused of being "chinilbanminjokhaengwi" (친일반민족행위, "pro-Japanese anti-nationalist active"), because of controversy over its advocacy of the Korea under Japanese rules. In 2005, the South Korean government and Korean nationalist civic activists investigated whether Chosun Ilbo 'collaborated' with the Japanese Empire. The Chosun Ilbo published an extremely praise article on Imperial House of Japan every year from 1938 to 1940. Until 1987, the newspaper had reported favorably to South Korea's military dictatorships.

See also

Chojoongdong
List of newspapers in South Korea
Communications in South Korea
Issues in reporting on North Korea

Notes

References

External links

 

1920 establishments in Korea
Korean-language newspapers
Daily newspapers published in South Korea
Conservative media in South Korea
Right-wing newspapers
Anti-communism in South Korea
English-language newspapers
Newspapers established in 1920
Newspapers published in Seoul